Steen Nygaard Hansen (born 31 May 1960) is a Danish former footballer who played as a centre-back. He made four appearances for the Denmark national team from 1981 to 1984.

References

External links
 
 

1960 births
Living people
Footballers from Copenhagen
Danish men's footballers
Association football central defenders
Denmark international footballers
Denmark youth international footballers
Denmark under-21 international footballers
Hvidovre IF players